Nadia Tehran (Nadia Kardar Tehran) (born 28 April 1990) is a Swedish artist of Iranian descent. Known for her aggressive, experimental and often political songwriting, she has received international acclaim for her recorded works and live performances.

Artistry
Tehran's music draws from a number of different sources, including hip hop, punk, experimental electronic, and traditional Persian music. This melange of influences is also visible in her stage show and artwork, where traditional Persian themes, dress, and artistic techniques are combined with modern and transgressive ones.

Personal life
As a teenager Tehran played in several punk bands to rebel against the conservative social climate of her home town.

While filming the music video for her song "Refugee"  with her father in Iran, Tehran was arrested and searched by the police. She has not returned to Iran since.

Discography

Albums
 Dozakh: All Lover's Hell (2019)

Extended plays
 Life Is Cheap, Death Is Free (2016)

References

Swedish rappers
Living people
1991 births